Lee Brogden (born 18 October 1949) is a former English  footballer who played as a winger.

References

1949 births
Living people
English footballers
Association football defenders
Rochdale A.F.C. players
English Football League players
Rotherham United F.C. players